Wandandian is a small village on the South Coast of New South Wales, Australia. It is located in the City of Shoalhaven on the Princes Highway about 30 kilometres south of Nowra.

Wandandian was first established as a Postal District in 1860, and has a rich history. The village takes its name from the Wandandian people, the traditional owners of much of the land now known as the City of Shoalhaven.

The village is home to  Kladis Estate Winery.

References

External links
Wandandian Progress Association

City of Shoalhaven
Towns in New South Wales
Towns in the South Coast (New South Wales)